Burak Can Yıldızlı (born July 9, 1996) is a Turkish professional basketball player for Beşiktaş Emlakjet of the Basketbol Süper Ligi (BSL) as a power forward.

References

External links
Burak Can Yıldızlı Basketball Champions League Profile
Burak Can Yıldızlı TBLStat.net Profile
Burak Can Yıldızlı Eurobasket Profile
Burak Can Yıldızlı TBL Profile

Living people
1994 births
Anadolu Efes S.K. players
Bahçeşehir Koleji S.K. players
Beşiktaş men's basketball players
Büyükçekmece Basketbol players
Karşıyaka basketball players
Pertevniyal S.K. players
Power forwards (basketball)
Turkish men's basketball players